2-Fluoroamphetamine
 2-Fluoroadenine